Enrique Fernando Santiago Romero (born 1964) is a Spanish lawyer and politician, who is the secretary-general of the Communist Party of Spain (PCE) since April 2018. He has been as member of the 13th Congress of Deputies, representing Madrid, since 2019.

Biography
Born on 18 July 1964 in Madrid, he affiliated to the Communist Party of Spain (PCE) in 1980. He earned a Licentiate degree in Law at the Complutense University of Madrid. A member of United Left (IU) since its beginnings as political alliance in 1986, he was the leader of the Communist Youth Union of Spain from 1991 to 1993. He has also chaired the Spanish Commission for Refugees (CEAR).

He has worker as lawyer, specialized in human rights and cases of trans-national justice, and took a role as IU representative in the public prosecution against Argentine and Chilean regimes, later filing a detention request against Chilean dictator Augusto Pinochet. He also worked as lawyer for the family of José Couso, cameraman killed in Baghdad in 2003 by US fire, participating in the particular accusation that presented a criminal inquiry before the Audiencia Nacional, accusing the US military personnel deemed responsible for the Couso's death.

The Central Committee of the PCE elected Santiago as the new Secretary-General of the party on 8 April 2018, replacing José Luis Centella.

He was IU's final choice to lead the party for the 2019 Congress of Deputies election in the constituency of Madrid (IU leader Alberto Garzón opted to stand as candidate in Málaga), integrating 3rd in the list of the Unidas Podemos coalition. He was elected, and became a member of the 13th term of the Lower House.

References 

 

Communist Party of Spain politicians
Members of the 13th Congress of Deputies (Spain)
1964 births
Living people
Members of the 14th Congress of Deputies (Spain)